Federico Boido (8 January 1938 – 7 October 2014), was an Italian film actor who appeared in many horror films, Spaghetti Westerns, and sword and sandal movies. He also acted in the Sadistik photo novels and related his experiences in the film The Diabolikal Super-Kriminal.

Boido was born in Novi Ligure, and made his film debut at the age of 26.  He appeared in over fifty films, including Planet of the Vampires (1965), Danger: Diabolik (1968),  Spirits of the Dead (1968), Roy Colt and Winchester Jack (1970),  and Superfly TNT (1973).  He had roles in numerous Italian westerns, including several appearances in the Sartana series.

Throughout his film career, he used a variety of screen names, such as Rico Boido, Rich Boyd, Rick Boyd, Rik Boyd, and Ryck Boyd.  He died in Ostia, Rome, aged 76.

Partial filmography

 1964 Hercules and the Treasure of the Incas as 'Tex'
 1965 Agent 3S3: Passport to Hell as Man In Vienna Bar (uncredited)
 1965 Maciste, the Avenger of the Mayans as Ulmar Guard
 1965 The Dirty Game as Sernas' Henchman At First Meeting With Ferrari (uncredited)
 1965 Planet of the Vampires as Keir
 1965 Thrilling as (segment "L'autostrada del sole")
 1966 Djurado as Tucan Henchman (uncredited)
 1967 The Seventh Floor as Guest At Pajama Party (uncredited)
 1967 Renegade Riders as Fred Calhoun 
 1967 Django Kills Softly as The Nervous One
 1967 Cjamango as Rowdy 'El Tigre Rowdy'
 1967 Halleluja for Django as Jarrett Gang Member
 1967 Bang Bang Kid (1967) as 'Sixfingers' Sykes (uncredited)
 1967 Face to Face as Sheriff of Purgatory City (uncredited)
 1968 Danger: Diabolik Joe, Valmont's Henchman
 1968 The Ruthless Four as Alfred Brady
 1968 Spirits of the Dead as Party Guest (segment "Toby Dammit") (uncredited)
 1968 I Want Him Dead as Unknown
 1968 Run, Man, Run as Steve Wilkins
 1968 A Sky Full of Stars for a Roof as Roger Pratt
 1968 Ace High as Drake's Blond Henchman
 1969 Fellini Satyricon as Scar-Faced Leader (uncredited)
 1969 I am Sartana, Your Angel of Death as Bill Cochram
 1969 I diavoli della guerra as Willy Wendt
 1969 Angels from 2000 as Drug Addict
 1970 Rangers: attacco ora X as Private McGregor
 1970 Django Defies Sartana as 1st Gunman (uncredited)
 1970 Sartana's Here... Trade Your Pistol for a Coffin as Joe Fossit
 1970 Roy Colt & Winchester Jack as Boida / Blondie
 1970 Sartana in the Valley of Death as Unknown
 1970 Wind from the East as Unknown
 1970 Adiós, Sabata as Geroll
 1970 Chapaqua's Gold as Billy George
 1970 Have a Good Funeral, My Friend... Sartana Will Pay as Jim Piggot
 1971 Tre nel mille as Unknown
 1971 They Call Me Hallelujah as 'Duke' Slocum
 1971 Joe Dakota as Chuck
 1971 His Name Was King as Sam Benson
 1971 Terrible Day of the Big Gundown as Peter Fargas
 1971 Return of Sabata as Gunman (uncredited)
 1971 Day of Judgment as Burt
 1971 They Call Him Cemetery as Ambusher (uncredited)
 1971 Trastevere as Hippie At St. Maria In Trastevere (uncredited)
 1971 Holy Water Joe as Gunman (uncredited)
 1972 His Name Was Holy Ghost as Vern Crohn
 1972 Two Brothers in Trinity as Blondie (uncredited)
 1972 Lo chiamavano verità as Unknown
 1972 Tutti fratelli nel West… per parte di padre as Unknown
 1973 Canterbury n° 2' Nuove storie d'amore del '300 as Aldo
 1973 Amico mio, frega tu... che frego io! as Teddy
 1973 Partirono preti, tornarono... curati as Unknown
 1973 Super Fly T.N.T. as Rik, Mercenary
 1973 Ci risiamo, vero Provvidenza? as Blonde Guy With Shotgun
 1973 The Fighting Fist of Shanghai Joe as 'Slim'
 1974 Brigitte, Laura, Ursula, Monica, Raquel, Litz, Florinda, Barbara, Claudia, e Sofia le chiamo tutte... anima mia as Unknown
 1976 Apache Woman as Keith
 1977 No alla violenza as Duilio Brogi
 1985 Joan Lui as Medico
 1988 Caro Gorbaciov as Unknown

References

External links
 

1938 births
2014 deaths
People from Novi Ligure
Italian male film actors
Male Spaghetti Western actors